Mirbelia rhagodioides is a species of flowering plant in the family Fabaceae and is endemic to inland areas of Western Australia. It is an erect, prickly shrub with clustered linear or narrowly elliptic leaves and yellow and red flowers.

Description

Taxonomy
Mirbelia rhagodioides was first formally described in 1987 by Michael Crisp and Joan M. Taylor in the Journal of the Adelaide Botanic Gardens from specimens collected near Laverton in 1931. The specific epithet (rhagodioides) means "Rhagodia-like".

Distribution and habitat
This mirbelia grows in shrubland on rocky hills and outcrops in the Avon Wheatbelt, Coolgardie, Gascoyne, Great Victoria Desert, Little Sandy Desert, Murchison and Yalgoo bioregions of inland Western Australia.

Conservation status
Mirbelia rhagodioides is listed as "not threatened" by the Government of Western Australia Department of Biodiversity, Conservation and Attractions.

References 

Flora of Western Australia
Plants described in 1987
rhagodioides
Taxa named by Michael Crisp